Ursus rail crash (Polish: Katastrofa kolejowa w Ursusie) was a major accident, which occurred at 6:20 a.m. on 20 August 1990 near the Warszawa Ursus railway station on the western part of Polish capital in which 16 people died and 43 were injured.

Accident

At 6:20 am, InterExpress no. 41008 Silesia  from Praha hl.n. to Warszawa Wschodnia ran into the last carriage of train no. 6114 from Szklarska Poręba to Warszawa Wschodnia; there was a mist with very low visibility. The train from Szklarska was travelling at 12 mph (17 km/h) while InterExpress Silesia (with Tadeusz Mościcki as its driver) was travelling at nearly 75 mph (120 km/h).

From circa 80 passengers travelling in the last carriage of Szklarska's train, telescoped by Silesia locomotive, 15 were killed at the moment of collision and one gravely injured person died later in hospital. 43 people were injured.

Investigation and aftermath

Two commissions: one from Scientific Railroading Institute and Regional Laboratory of Automatic and another formed by members of National Labour Inspectorate never ruled with 100% certainty whether Mościcki passed signal at danger indeed or it was malfunction of signalling.

According to driver of train from Szklarska Poręba, block signal no. 94 showed a red signal, which orders to stop; however, because it was an automatic block signal, the driver could proceed after two minutes with maximum speed of 13 mph (20 km/h). Mościcki stated throughout the legal case, that the same block signal had showed green signal. There was no ATP-like system on PKP at that time.

One year after the accident, a similar dangerous situation as in 1990 has happened on the same line, but accident was avoided due to good visibility at the time. The cause was determined to be signal fault. Eventually, Silesia driver was found not guilty of the accident because of lack of evidence that signal had a red aspect ("all stop" signal) which would inform that there would be a train on preceding rail block ("in dubio pro reo" rule – "when in doubt, for the accused"). He never returned to work in PKP.

References

External links
photo from accident's site

Sources
J. Reszka, "Cześć, giniemy! Największe katastrofy w powojennej Polsce", wyd. PAP, 2001

Transport in Poland
Train collisions in Poland
Railway accidents in 1990
Railway accidents involving fog
1990 in Poland
Railway accidents involving a signal passed at danger
1990 disasters in Poland